The International Bar-B-Q Festival is an event held in Owensboro, Kentucky, every second weekend in May since 1979, except 2020 when it was cancelled. The festival provides an opportunity for sampling many varieties of barbecued meats, including chicken, mutton, and burgoo. Cooking teams compete for the Governor's Cup, awarded to the team judged to have the best barbecued cuisine. Other attractions include square dancing, musical performances, and arts and crafts. The Kentucky Department of Tourism recently (in 2006) projected an expected attendance of 85,000 for the festival.

The COVID-19 pandemic in 2020 caused the festival to go on hiatus until May 2021, when strict measures will be undertaken hereafter, such as social distancing and wearing masks.

See also
Cuisine of Kentucky

References

External links
International Bar-B-Q Festival Home Page
Commemorative Coca-Cola bottle for 20th anniversary of the festival
Pictures from the festival featured in Southern Living Magazine
Festival featured by the Travel Channel

Festivals established in 1979
Festivals in Kentucky
Owensboro, Kentucky
Barbecue
Tourist attractions in Daviess County, Kentucky
1979 establishments in Kentucky
Food and drink festivals in the United States